Jon Christiano (born July 8, 1958) is an American former ice hockey coach. He was an assistant coach in the National Hockey League with the Buffalo Sabres during the 1998–99 NHL season.

Born in Buffalo, New York, Christiano is currently employed by the Buffalo Sabres as their Director of Professional Scouting.

References

External links

Jon Christiano's team staff history at Eliteprospects.com

1958 births
Living people
Buffalo Sabres coaches
Buffalo Sabres scouts
Ice hockey coaches from New York (state)
Sportspeople from Buffalo, New York